David Jairus Ochieng Okumu (born 12 October 1976 in Vienna, Austria) is a singer, songwriter, producer and guitarist, best known for fronting the band the Invisible. Their debut album, released in March 2009, was nominated for a Mercury Prize (2009) and selected as iTunes Album of the Year.

Okumu grew up in Vienna, surrounded by music enthusiasts. He relocated with his family to the UK when he was 10. His love of music, which developed from a young age, led him to become a songwriter, producer and performing musician. He has performed and recorded with many artists, such as Robert Miles, Amy Winehouse, St. Vincent, Rosie Lowe, Jane Birkin, Sara Creative Partners, Brigitte Fontaine, Theo Parrish, Tony Allen, King Sunny Adé, Omar, Matthew Herbert, Dani Siciliano, Toddla T, Bilal, Jack De Johnette, and Anna Calvi.

Okumu began working with Jessie Ware in 2010, co-writing and producing Ware's debut album, Devotion, which was later nominated for Album of the Year (2012) by the Mercury Prize.

Discography

With the Invisible
 2009: The Invisible
 2012: Rispah
 2016: Patience

Other collaborations
 2018: Undone: Live at the Crypt (as part of Okumu/Herbert/Skinner)
 2021: The Solution Is Restless (with Joan As Police Woman and Tony Allen)
 2023: London Brew (as part of London Brew)

Solo artist
 2021: Knopperz

References 

1976 births
Living people
21st-century British male singers
Austrian emigrants to the United Kingdom
British record producers
Black British rock musicians